The Glass Castle (French: Le Château de verre) is a 1950 French romantic drama film directed by René Clément who co-wrote the screenplay with Gian Bistolfi and Pierre Bost, based on the 1935 novel Das große Einmaleins by Vicki Baum. The film stars Michèle Morgan and Jean Marais, Jean Servais (French version), Fosco Giachetti (Italian version) and Elisa Cegani.

The film's sets were designed by the art director Léon Barsacq.

Main characters
Michèle Morgan as  Evelyne Lorin-Bertal 
Jean Marais as  Rémy Marsay 
Jean Servais as  Laurent Bertal (French version) 
Fosco Giachetti as  Laurent Bertal (Italian version) 
Elisa Cegani as  Eléna 
Elina Labourdette as  Marion 
Giovanna Galletti as  Louise Morel - l'accusée 
André Carnège as  Le secrétaire 
Roger Dalphin as  Marcel 
Albert Michel as  Le charmeur d'oiseaux 
Colette Régis as  La tenancière de l'hôtel 
Allain Dhurtal as  Le procureur

See also
 Rendezvous in Paris (1982 film)

References

External links

Le Château de verre at DvdToile

1950 films
1950s French-language films
1950 romantic drama films
Films directed by René Clément
French multilingual films
Films based on Austrian novels
Films with screenplays by Pierre Bost
Italian multilingual films
1950s multilingual films
French black-and-white films
French romantic drama films
1950s French films